Kromdraai (means crooked turn in afrikaans) is a fossil-bearing breccia-filled cave located about  east of the well-known South African hominid-bearing site of Sterkfontein and about  northwest of Johannesburg, South Africa. It is situated within the Cradle of Humankind World Heritage Site and is itself a South African National Heritage Site.

History of investigations

In 1938, the site was brought to the attention of Robert Broom by a local schoolboy named Gert Terrblanche who had discovered several hominin teeth. The teeth formed part of a skull that would become the holotype of Paranthropus robustus. Broom began excavations at the site that would continue until approximately 1947 and would result in the discovery of numerous hominin remains. Two deposits were noted and named at the site — Kromdraai A (KA) and Kromdraai B (KB)— the latter being the site where the hominin remains were recovered.

In 1955 C.K. Brain recommenced work at Kromdraai B and discovered numerous additional hominin remains as well as abundant non-hominin fauna.

In the 1980s Elizabeth Vrba briefly conducted excavations at Kromdraai B in order to recover additional samples for her work on South African bovids.

In 1993 excavations were re-opened by Francis Thackeray of the Transvaal Museum and Lee Berger of the University of the Witwatersrand and are currently ongoing. Thackeray and Berger were later joined by teams from Harvard University and other collaborators. Important results of this work have been the recovery of additional hominin fossils as well as the obtaining of more accurate dates for the site.

Recovered fossils
Besides the holotype specimen of P. robustus, at the time of the writing of this article 29 hominin specimens had been recovered from Kromdraai B. Many thousands of animal fossils have also been recovered from both Kromdraai A and B. By 2014, the Kromdraai B fossil assemblages totaled 6,067 specimens.

Age of the deposits
Kromdraai B is dated to between approximately 2.0 - 1.6 Ma with the majority if not all the Paranthropus robustus fossils dating to between 1.8 and 1.6 Ma.

Geology
Kromdraai is a roofless dolomite cave on the southern side of Blaauwbank stream. It consists of two fossil-bearing localities, Kromdraai A (KA) and Kromdraai B (KB). KB is the main fossil deposit at the Kromdraai site. The boundaries of both localities are lined by dolomite.

See also
 Cradle of Humankind
 Hominids
 Kromdraai Conservancy
 List of fossil sites
 Paranthropus robustus

References

Archaeological sites in South Africa
Archaeological sites of Southern Africa
Caves of South Africa
Landforms of Gauteng
Limestone caves
Paleoanthropological sites
Pleistocene paleontological sites of Africa
South African heritage sites